NGC 7606 is a spiral galaxy located in the constellation Aquarius. It is located at a distance of circa 100 million light years from Earth, which, given its apparent dimensions, means that NGC 7606 is about 165,000 light years across. It was discovered by William Herschel on September 28, 1785. The galaxy is included in the Herschel 400 Catalogue. It lies 45 arcminutes northeast from psi2 Aquarii. It can be seen with a 4 inch telescope but its visibility is greatly affected by light pollution.

Characteristics 
NGC 7606 is a spiral galaxy seen on inclination. It has a bright nucleus surrounded by a prominent bulge, which is seen elliptical due to the inclination. No bar has been observed. A ring with an apparent diameter of 0.85 arcminutes has been detected at the central part of the galaxy. The galaxy features two main arms, that can be traced for nearly 360°, and several arm fragments. The arms are smooth and rather tight, although not as tightly wound as the ones of NGC 488. Few bright spots have been observed in the arms. The galaxy is found to host a supermassive black hole, whose mass based on bulge velocity dispersion σ is estimated to be 15-22 million . NGC 7606 is an isolated galaxy.

Two supernovae have been observed in NGC 7606, SN 1965M (magnitude 16.0), and SN 1987N (type Ia, magnitude 13.8).

Gallery

References

External links 

Unbarred spiral galaxies
Aquarius (constellation)
7606
71047
Astronomical objects discovered in 1785
Discoveries by William Herschel